Laxmannia minor, also known as paperlily, is flowering herbaceous plant that occurs in Southwest Australia. It is a slender, perennial stoloniferous plant, propped on its roots to avoid desiccation when the soil surface temperature is high. White flowers are presented on a scape from September to December. The flowerhead is a small cluster of 18–28 flowers.

The preference is for black or grey peaty soil on winter wet plains or the regional granite outcrops.

The description of the species was published by Robert Brown in 1810.

References

minor
Endemic flora of Western Australia
Taxa named by Robert Brown (botanist, born 1773)
Plants described in 1810